Brecon is a census-designated place (CDP) in Sycamore Township, Hamilton County, Ohio, United States. The population was 408 at the 2020 census.

History
Brecon was a depot on the Cincinnati, Lebanon and Northern Railway. In 1894, it was described as a village of 50 inhabitants with a store, school and church.

Geography
The community is bordered by the CDP of Highpoint to the north, unincorporated Sycamore Township to the east, the city of Montgomery to the south, the city of Blue Ash to the southwest, and the city of Sharonville to the northwest.

References

Census-designated places in Hamilton County, Ohio
Census-designated places in Ohio